Brachychampsa is an extinct genus of alligatoroid, possibly a basal caiman. Specimens have been reported from New Mexico, Colorado, Wyoming, Montana, North and South Dakota, New Jersey, and Saskatchewan, though only those from Montana, Utah, and New Mexico are based on material sufficient to justify the referral. One specimen has been reported from the Darbasa Formation of Kazakhstan, although the species status is indeterminate for the fossil. The genus first appeared during the late Campanian stage of the Late Cretaceous (Judithian North American stage) and became extinct during the late Maastrichtian stage of the Cretaceous (Lancian North American Land Mammal "Age"). Brachychampsa is distinguished by an enlarged fifth maxillary tooth in the upper jaw.

Species
The type species of Brachychampsa is B. montana, first discovered from the Hell Creek Formation of Montana and described by Charles W. Gilmore in a paper in 1911. In that same paper, Gilmore recombined Bottosaurus perrugosus as a new species of Brachychampsa, called B. perrugosus. The holotype specimen of B. perrugosus went missing as the paper was being written, but it was later rediscovered and soon afterward designated as a nomen dubium due to a lack of diagnostic features that distinguish it from other alligatorids discovered since the paper was published. Another species from the Allison Member of the Menefee Formation of the San Juan Basin, B. sealeyi, was discovered in 1996, but was later argued to be synonymous with B. montana by interpreting it as an immature specimen of the latter species. However, other studies have shown that some of the variation seen between the two species, such as the orientation of the maxillary tooth row, are not ontogenic, thus making B. sealeyi a valid taxon.

Phylogeny
Brachychampsa'''s position within Alligatoroidea has undergone many revisions since it was first named. Originally it was placed within Alligatoridae, and was later refined to the Alligatorinae in 1964, only to be placed outside both Alligatorinae and Alligatoridae (but still within Alligatoroidea) in 1994. Accordingly, studies have shown Brachychampsa as a basal member of Alligatoroidea, within the clade Globidonta, as shown in the cladogram below.

Alternatively, other phylogenetic studies have recovered Brachychampsa'' as an alligatorid, specifically as a stem-caiman, as shown in the cladogram below.

References

External links 

 Brachychampsa in the Paleobiology Database

Crocodilians
Alligatoridae
Late Cretaceous crocodylomorphs of North America
Paleogene crocodylomorphs
Late Cretaceous reptiles of North America
Paleocene reptiles of North America
Hell Creek fauna
Fossil taxa described in 1911
Taxa named by Charles W. Gilmore
Prehistoric pseudosuchian genera